Cigeľka is a village and municipality in Bardejov District in the Prešov Region of north-east Slovakia with Ruthenian and Roma inhabitants. It lies in the valley of Oľchovec below the Busov hill (1 002 meters above sea level) near the Slovakia-Poland border. There is a Greek Catholic church of Saints Cosmas and Damian in the year 1816, which served its first liturgy Presov later Bishop Paul Peter Gojdič.

History 

In historical records the village was first mentioned in 1414. In the following centuries the estate belonged to Makovica manor. In the 19th century the village was affected by emigration to North America for economic reasons, in 1947 the proportion of the population at the instigation of the Soviet authorities moved to Ukraine (in particular the village Chomut, the current name Zelenyj Haj – Зелений Гай), from the 20th to the sixties the dawn of the 21st century centuries, the majority returned to Slovakia.

The village has a memorial to the victims of World War II from Cigeľka – especially the seven young boys who were sent to fight the war ended without proper training, and a few Jewish families whose members died in concentration camps. Memorial was unveiled in October 1989. Its author is a painter Mikuláš Lovacký.

Geography 

The municipality lies at an altitude of 526 metres and covers an area of 15 984 km².
It has a population of about 464 people.

Mineral water 

There is a spring mineral water the same name. Almanac "Spas of Czechoslovak Republic of 1949" states as Cigeľka spa place for the treatment of gastric diseases, diseases of upper respiratory tract, heart and blood vessels, and skin diseases. At present, Cigeľka hasn't the status of spa. In addition to salt mineral water springs in Cigeľka from dozens of sources acidulous water.

Genealogical resources

The records for genealogical research are available at the state archive "Statny Archiv in Presov, Slovakia"

 Roman Catholic church records (births/marriages/deaths): 1800-1895 (parish B)
 Greek Catholic church records (births/marriages/deaths): 1809-1948 (parish A)

See also
 List of municipalities and towns in Slovakia

External links 
 
 
 https://web.archive.org/web/20071217080336/http://www.statistics.sk/mosmis/eng/run.html
Surnames of living people in Cigelka

Villages and municipalities in Bardejov District
Šariš